"A Girl's Gotta Do (What a Girl's Gotta Do)" is a song written by Robert Byrne and Rick Bowles, and recorded by American country music artist Mindy McCready.  It was released in February 1997 as the fourth single from the album Ten Thousand Angels.  The song reached number 4 on the Billboard Hot Country Singles & Tracks chart.

Chart performance
"A Girl's Gotta Do (What a Girl's Gotta Do)" debuted at number 59 on the U.S. Billboard Hot Country Singles & Tracks for the week of March 1, 1997.

Year-end charts

References

1997 singles
Mindy McCready songs
Songs written by Robert Byrne (songwriter)
Song recordings produced by David Malloy
Song recordings produced by Norro Wilson
BNA Records singles
Songs written by Rick Bowles
1995 songs